Carlos Corberán Vallet (born 7 April 1983) is a Spanish football coach who is currently head coach of EFL Championship side West Bromwich Albion.

Previously the head coach of Doxa and Ermis in the Cypriot First Division, Corberán was first team assistant coach and manager of the under-23s side at Leeds United. He then managed in his own right at Huddersfield Town and Olympiacos.

Playing career
Born in Cheste, Valencian Community, Corberán represented Valencia CF as a youth. At the age of 23, however, after only representing the team's reserves and playing no higher than Tercera División, he decided to retire to pursue his passion for coaching.

Coaching career

Early career
After retiring, Corberán subsequently started working at Villarreal CF's C and B-teams, as a fitness coach. In 2011, after the appointment of Juan Carlos Garrido in the first team, he was named fitness coach of the main squad.

In February 2012, Corberán signed for Saudi Arabian team Al-Ittihad Club alongside head coach Raúl Caneda, having been recommended by Pep Guardiola. Whilst at the club, he was a fitness coach and helped get the club to the semi-finals of the AFC Champions League.

In July 2013, Corberán was appointed manager of AD Alcorcón's Juvenil A squad, but was relieved from his duties and subsequently replaced by José María Rico the following January. In 2014, he returned to Saudi Arabia and joined Al-Nassr FC and was named Caneda's assistant. They were runners-up in the Super Cup, and reached the group phase in the AFC Champions League and were also finalists in the King's Cup.

Cyprus
On 29 November 2016, Corberán had his first senior managerial experience after being appointed in charge of Doxa Katokopias in the Cypriot First Division. The following 24 January, however, he was sacked.

Corberán was appointed the new head coach of Ermis Aradippou also in the Cypriot top tier on 30 January 2017, where he helped guide them to a seventh place finish before being replaced by Nicos Panayiotou.

Leeds United
On 21 June 2017, Corberán was announced as the new Leeds United under-23 manager, replacing the departed Jason Blunt. 

After the appointment of new head coach Marcelo Bielsa in June 2018, Corberán was promoted to first team coach as well as continuing his role as the head coach of the Under 23s. In October 2018, Corberán was described as "very talented" by Bielsa, with Bielsa stating he values Corberán's opinion "more than his own".

Corberán's side won the PDL Northern League 2018–19 season by winning the league, they then became the national Professional Development League Champions by beating Birmingham City in the final.

In June 2019, it was reported that Corberán would be offered the head coach job at Spanish side Cultural y Deportiva Leonesa, but he decided to stay at Leeds to remain under Bielsa. A year later, Leeds earned promotion to the Premier League as EFL Championship winners.

Huddersfield Town
In July 2020, Corberán was offered the position of head coach at Huddersfield Town, which he accepted and his appointment was confirmed on 23 July. On his debut on 5 September, the Championship club lost 1–0 at home to Rochdale in the first round of the EFL Cup; the first league game a week later saw the same score against Norwich City also at the Kirklees Stadium.

Corberán missed the opening game of the 2021–22 season due to a positive COVID-19 test. The 2021–22 season saw the Terriers finish in third position. After drawing the first leg of the play-off semi-finals 1–1 away from home, a 1–0 home victory saw them defeat Luton Town and set up a final with Nottingham Forest at Wembley Stadium. The match was decided with a Huddersfield own goal.

On 7 July 2022, Corberán resigned from his position as head coach.

Olympiacos
On 1 August 2022, Corberán was appointed head coach of Olympiacos. He was fired after a 2-1 defeat by Aris in Thessaloniki, with his team 6th in Super League Greece.

West Bromwich Albion
On 25 October 2022, Corberán returned to the English Championship, being appointed head coach of West Bromwich Albion on a 2-year deal. He joined a team that were second from bottom after 16 games. His debut four days later was a 2–0 home loss to Sheffield United. He won 10 of the next 12 league games. On 7 February 2023, amid speculation of a return to Leeds following their sacking of Jesse Marsch, Corberán signed a contract extension keeping him at the club until 2027.

Managerial statistics

Honours

Manager
Leeds United U23
Professional Development Northern League: 2018–19 season
Professional Development League: 2018–19 season

Individual
EFL Championship Manager of the Month: February 2022

References

1983 births
Living people
Sportspeople from the Province of Valencia
Spanish footballers
Footballers from the Valencian Community
Association football goalkeepers
Valencia CF Mestalla footballers
Spanish football managers
Association football coaches
Cypriot First Division managers
Doxa Katokopias FC managers
Leeds United F.C. non-playing staff
Huddersfield Town A.F.C. managers
Spanish expatriate football managers
Spanish expatriate sportspeople in Cyprus
Spanish expatriate sportspeople in England
Expatriate football managers in Cyprus
Expatriate football managers in England
Ermis Aradippou FC managers
Spanish expatriate sportspeople in Greece
Expatriate football managers in Greece
Olympiacos F.C. managers
Super League Greece managers